KVDF-CD, virtual and UHF digital channel 31, is a low-powered, Class A Circle-affiliated television station licensed to San Antonio, Texas, United States. The station is owned by HC2 Holdings.

Digital channels
The station's digital signal is multiplexed:

References

External links

Innovate Corp.
VDF-CD
Television channels and stations established in 1996
Spanish-language television stations in Texas
Low-power television stations in the United States